Abramavičius is a Lithuanian language family name.

They may refer to:
Liudvikas Abramavičius (1879–1939), Polish-Lithianian cultural activist
Leonardas Abramavičius (died 1960), Lithuanian chess player
Agnė Abramavičiūtė, Lithuanian athlete

Lithuanian-language surnames
Patronymic surnames